Ke Zhao or Chao Ko (April 12, 1910 – November 8, 2002) was a Chinese mathematician born in Wenling, Taizhou, Zhejiang.

Biography
Ke graduated from Tsinghua University in 1933 and obtained his doctorate from the University of Manchester under Louis Mordell in 1937. His main fields of study were algebra, number theory and combinatorics. Some of his major contributions included his work on quadratic forms, the Erdős–Ko–Rado theorem and his theorem on Catalan's conjecture. In 1955, he was one of the founding members of the Chinese Academy of Sciences. He was later a professor at Sichuan University and became the president of the university and of the Chinese Mathematical Society.

References

1910 births
2002 deaths
Alumni of the Victoria University of Manchester
20th-century Chinese mathematicians
Educators from Taizhou, Zhejiang
Mathematicians from Zhejiang
Members of the Chinese Academy of Sciences
People of the Republic of China
Scientists from Taizhou, Zhejiang
Xiamen University alumni
Tsinghua University alumni
Academic staff of Tsinghua University
Presidents of Sichuan University